Thomas Gunn (10 July 1843 – 4 May 1908) was an English cricketer. He played six first-class matches for Surrey between 1863 and 1869.

See also
 List of Surrey County Cricket Club players

References

External links
 

1843 births
1908 deaths
English cricketers
Surrey cricketers
People from Croydon
Sportspeople from Surrey